National Highway 102C, commonly referred to as NH 102C is a national highway in  India. It is a spur road of National Highway 102. NH-102C traverses the state of Manipur in India.

Route description 
Pallel - Chandel.

Major intersections 

  Terminal near Palel.

See also 

 List of National Highways in India
 List of National Highways in India by state

References

External links 

 NH 102C on OpenStreetMap

National highways in India
National Highways in Manipur